Prosthechea brassavolae is a species of orchid native to Central America and Mexico. It is cultivated by orchid fanciers.

References

External links

brassavolae
Orchids of Mexico
Orchids of Central America